was a town located in Hazu District, Aichi Prefecture, Japan.

As of May 1, 2004, the village had an estimated population of 23,775 and a population density of 1055.25 persons per km². Its total area was 22.53 km².

Isshiki was a coastal settlement in southern Aichi Prefecture, on Mikawa Bay. The town economy was based on commercial fishing, horticulture and seasonal tourism. The modern town was founded on October 1, 1923, and expanded in August 1954 by merging with adjacent Sakuma Village.

On April 1, 2011, Isshiki, along with the towns of Hazu and Kira (all from Hazu District), was merged into the expanded city of Nishio. Hazu District was dissolved as a result of this merger.

External links

 Nishio official website 

Dissolved municipalities of Aichi Prefecture
Nishio, Aichi